Events from the year 1420 in France.

Incumbents
 Monarch – Charles VI

Events
 21 May - The Treaty of Troyes is signed. Charles VI acknowledges Henry V of England as his heir
 2 June - Charles VI's daughter Catherine of Valois marries Henry V

Births
 Unknown - Jean Fouquet, painter (died 1481)

Deaths
 9 August - Pierre d'Ailly, cardinal (born 1351)

References

1420s in France